The Electric Supply Corporation Limited was an electricity industry holding company that operated from 1897 until 1948. The corporation and its subsidiary companies generated and supplied electricity to towns and districts in Scotland and England.

Foundation 
The Electric Supply Corporation Limited was registered on 8 April 1897 by the Crompton and Company Limited to acquire electricity undertakings and to generate and supply electricity for lighting, power and traction. Crompton subsequently transferred its assets to the Electric Supply Corporation Limited.

Management 
The founding subscribers to the corporation were: R.E.B. Crompton; F.R. Reeves; H. Stevenson; C. Peel; A. Williams; H. Walker; and F. Holmes. The capital authorized was 1,000 shares of £5 each.

The company's management board in 1904 comprised: Carleton Fowell Tufnell (chairman); Home Gordon; Major Charles Heaton-Ellis; and Colonel Henry Wood.

John George Brand Stone was chairman in 1913, 1923 and 1932. In 1923 the other directors were Sir Gordon Home; Ralph Tichborne Hinches; Edwin Herbert Francis Reeves; Alan Archibald Campbell Swinton; and Kenneth Alexander Scott-Moncrieff (managing director). Kenneth Alexander Scott-Moncrieff was chairman in 1935 and 1937. A.J. Fippard was chairman from 1939 to 1948.

The company's registered office was Salisbury House, London Wall, London until about 1930 when it transferred to Winchester House, Old Broad Street, London.

Operating districts 
The towns and urban districts where the Electric Supply Corporation Limited had an interest in developing an electricity system in 1904 were as follows. The date when electricity was first supplied and the subsequent operator is also shown.

Operating data 
The growth of electricity supplies and income from sales of electricity (1905 to 1936) are shown on the table.

Generating plant 1923 
The engineering details of the power stations operated by the Electric Supply Corporation Limited in 1923 were as follows.

In addition the Corporation operated Dumbarton power station on behalf of the local authority.

In addition the Corporation operated Exmouth and Hitchin power stations on behalf of the respective local authority.
By 1930 the Electric Supply Corporation Limited either owned the following undertakings or subsidiary companies:

 Alton District Electricity Company, sold 1931
 Central Sussex Electricity Limited
 Dumbarton General Omnibus Company
 Newhaven and Seaford Electricity Company Limited
 Peterhead Electricity Company Limited
 Petersfield Electric light and Power Company Limited
 Steyning Electric Light Company Limited
 Uckfield Gas and Electricity Company

It was noted in 1935 that the corporation had owned 11 undertakings in 1925 but by 1935 it owned just three: Dumbarton, Falmouth and St Andrews, plus seven operated by subsidiary companies.

In 1946 the only power station operated by the Electric Supply Corporation was Falmouth which sent out 32.1 MWh with a load of 56 kW.

Dissolution 
Under the terms of the Electricity Act 1947 the British electricity was nationalized with effect from 1 April 1948. The Electric Supply Corporation Limited was dissolved and its sole power station at Falmouth was vested in the Central Electricity Authority. The remainder of the undertaking was vested in the South Western Electricity Board.

See also 

 South London Electric Supply Corporation Limited
 Urban Electric Supply Company Limited

References 

Defunct electric power companies of the United Kingdom
Electric power companies of England
Electric power infrastructure in England
Electric power companies of Scotland
Electric power infrastructure in Scotland
Energy companies disestablished in 1948
1948 disestablishments in Scotland
British companies disestablished in 1948